Events in the year 1912 in Belgium.

Incumbents
Monarch: Albert I
Prime Minister: Charles de Broqueville

Events

 Date uncertain – Jean Neuhaus II begins producing soft-centre pralines to be sold in the Galeries Royales Saint-Hubert
 5 May-22 July – Belgium at the 1912 Summer Olympics in Stockholm
 2 June – 1912 Belgian general election returns the Catholic Party to power with an increased majority.
 9 June – Provincial elections
 15 August – Revue de Belgique publishes Jules Destrée's open letter to the King calling for the separation of the Belgian state.
 28 October – Léonie de Waha and Marguerite Delchef found the Union des femmes de Wallonie
 3 November – Frenchman René Thomas wins the Coupe d'Ostende
 December – Antwerp Engineering Co. completes work on the Hispania

Publications
 Thomas Braun, Fumée d'Ardenne, with cover art by Georges Lemmen (Brussels, Edmond Deman)
 Hippolyte Fierens-Gevaert, Les Primitifs Flamands, volume 2 (Brussels, G. Van Oest)
 Émile Verhaeren, Les Blés mouvants

Art and architecture

Paintings
 Fernand Khnopff, Portrait of Prince Leopold of Belgium

Buildings
 Louis Cloquet, Gent-Sint-Pieters railway station

Births
 12 January – Charles Moeller, theologian and literary critic (died 1986)
 15 March – Louis Paul Boon, novelist (died 1979)
 27 April – Franz Weyergans, writer and translator (died 1974)
 3 May – May Sarton, writer (died 1995)
 31 May – Jean de Selys Longchamps, RAF fighter pilot (died 1943)
 4 July – Edward Vissers, cyclist (died 1994)
 8 July – Jacques Stehman, composer (died 1975)
 10 August – Romain Maes, cyclist (died 1983)
 22 September – Éloi Meulenberg, cyclist (died 1989)
 24 September – Pierre Fallon, missionary (died 1985)
 6 October – Adolf Braeckeveldt, cyclist (died 1985)
 24 November – François Neuville, cyclist (died 1986)

Deaths

 28 January – Gustave de Molinari (born 1819), economist
 31 March – Gustave Boël (born 1837), industrialist and politician
 10 May – Arthur Gaillard (born 1847), archivist
 25 June – Louis-Joseph Antoine (born 1846), faith healer
 6 October – Auguste Beernaert (born 1829), politician
 23 November – Charles Bourseul (born 1829), telegraph engineer
 26 November – Princess Marie of Belgium (born 1845)

References

 
1910s in Belgium